Terinebrica is a genus of moths belonging to the family Tortricidae.

Species
Terinebrica achrostos Razowski & Becker, 2001
Terinebrica chaulioda Razowski & Becker, 2001
Terinebrica cidna Razowski & Becker, 2001
Terinebrica complicata Razowski & Becker, 2001
Terinebrica cornicenthes Razowski & Becker, 2001
Terinebrica fortifera Razowski, 1991
Terinebrica inconspigua Razowski & Becker, 2001
Terinebrica inouei Razowski, 1987
Terinebrica larocana Razowski & Becker, 2001
Terinebrica multidens Razowski & Wojtusiak, 2010
Terinebrica orthoscia (Meyrick, 1936)
Terinebrica paulista Razowski & Becker, 2001
Terinebrica phaloniodes (Meyrick, 1932)
Terinebrica pharetrata Razowski, 1987
Terinebrica polycornuta Razowski, 1999
Terinebrica polyseta Razowski & Becker, 2001
Terinebrica portentifica Razowski & Becker, 2001
Terinebrica saetigera Razowski, 1987
Terinebrica seiugata Razowski, 1987
Terinebrica spiniloba Razowski & Becker, 2001
Terinebrica spinodela Razowski, 1997
Terinebrica tenebrica Razowski, 1987
Terinebrica triplex Razowski & Becker, 2001
Terinebrica vectura Razowski & Becker, 2001

See also
List of Tortricidae genera

References

 , 2005: World catalogue of insects volume 5 Tortricidae.
 , 2001: Revision of the Neotropical Euliini Genus Terinebrica Razowski, 1987 (Lepidoptera: Tortricidae). Acta Zoologica Cracoviensia, 44 (3): 253–251.
 , 2010: Tortricidae (Lepidoptera) from Peru. Acta Zoologica Cracoviensia 53B (1-2): 73-159. . Full article: .

External links
tortricidae.com

Euliini
Tortricidae genera